Tsukitenshin 月天心 is Hitoto You's (一青窈) first studio album.

Description
Design 26 years 
another name / "a lunch of child whom an adult can eat"

Track listing
"あこるでぃおん" (akorudion) Accordion
"もらい泣き" (morainaki) Sympathy Tears
"Sunny Side Up"
"イマドコ" (ima doko) Where Are You Now?
"犬" (inu) Dog
"月天心" (tsukitenshin) Moon in the Center of the Sky
"ジャングルジム" (jangurujimu) Jungle Gym
"心変わり" (kokoro gawari) Change of Heart
"アリガ十々" (arigatou) Thank You
"望春風" (Wangchunfeng - Chinese) (Boushunfuu - Japanese)

2002 debut albums